Sternotomis pulchra is a species of beetle belonging to the family Cerambycidae.

Description
Head, thorax and elyra are orange-coloured. The thorax bears transversal black rings and a spine on each side. Elytra shows some black markings and light green patches. Femora and tibiae are green. Antennae are black and longer than the beetle. These cerambycids feed on Liberian coffee  (Coffea liberica).

Distribution
This species can be found in Senegal, Sierra Leone, Liberia, Ivory Coast, Ghana, Togo, Benin, Nigeria, Cameroon, Central African Republic, Zaire, Sudan, Republic of the Congo, Gabon, Uganda and Angola.

References
 Biolib
 F. VITALI - Cerambycoidea
 Dru Drury, John Obadiah Westwood - Illustrations of exotic entomology

Sternotomini
Beetles described in 1773
Beetles of the Democratic Republic of the Congo
Insects of the Republic of the Congo
Insects of the Central African Republic
Insects of West Africa
Insects of Cameroon
Insects of Sudan
Insects of Gabon
Insects of Angola
Insects of Uganda
Arthropods of Sierra Leone
Fauna of Liberia
Fauna of Ivory Coast
Fauna of Togo
Fauna of Ghana
Fauna of Nigeria
Fauna of Benin
Taxa named by Dru Drury